Carinodrillia zooki is an extinct species of sea snail, a marine gastropod mollusk in the family Pseudomelatomidae, the turrids and allies.

Description
The length of the shell attains 20.5 mm, its diameter 8.5 mm.

(Original description) This species is very similar to † Carinodrillia fusiformis (Gabb, 1873), but differs as follows: the anterior canal is mich shorter. There is no cord at the lower edge of the sutural fasciole, above the supraperipheral cord. There are eleven somewhat protractive longitudinal folds on the body whorl, which are narrower than in C. fusilformis . In other respects, the two species seem to be substantially alike.

Distribution
Fossils of this marine species were found in Miocene strata of the Gatun Formation in Panama.

References

 A. J. W. Hendy, D. P. Buick, K. V. Bulinski, C. A. Ferguson, and A. I. Miller. 2008. Unpublished census data from Atlantic coastal plain and circum-Caribbean Neogene assemblages and taxonomic opinions

External links
 Worldwide Mollusc Species Data Base : Carinodrillia zooki

zooki
Gastropods described in 1911